"Third Finger, Left Hand" may refer to:

Third Finger, Left Hand (film), 1940 American romantic comedy film
"Third Finger, Left Hand" (song), 1972 song by The Pearls